Yisgav is a residential neighborhood of Tel Aviv, Israel. It is located in the northeastern part of the city.

References

Neighborhoods of Tel Aviv